A variety store (also five and dime (historic), pound shop, or dollar store) is a retail store that sells general merchandise, such as apparel, automotive parts, dry goods, toys, hardware, home furnishings, and a selection of groceries. It usually sells them at discounted prices, sometimes at one or several fixed price points, such as one dollar, or historically, five and ten cents. Variety stores do not include larger formats: general merchandise superstores (hypermarkets) such as Target and Walmart. Warehouse clubs like Costco, grocery stores, and department stores are also not considered variety stores.

Economics

Pricing and margins
Some items are offered at a considerable discount over other retailers, whereas others are at the same price point. There are two ways variety stores make a profit:
 Buying and selling vast amounts of goods at heavily discounted prices provides a small profit margin multiplied by the volume of sales.
 Pricing many items at prices that are higher than regular retailers. These goods are commonly bought by consumers who perceive them to be bargains based on the heavy discounts on other items in the store. In the case of fixed price-point retailers, this can be achieved by reducing the size of the package.

Variety stores with single price points buy products to fit those price points (while making a profit) that are:
 generic brands or private labels, often specially manufactured using cheaper materials and processes than usual.
 available through the grey market.
 bought at a closeout sale, such as seasonal or promotional goods or bankruptcy stock.
 sold in smaller unit sizes than elsewhere.

Not all variety stores are "single price-point" stores, even if their names imply it. For example, in the United States, Dollar General and Family Dollar sell items at more or less than a dollar. Some stores also sell goods priced at multiples of the named price and, conversely, multiple items for the price. The discrepancy with the nominal price is also compounded if sales tax is added at the point of sale.

Supply
In many countries, stock can be imported from others with lower variable costs, because of differences in wages, resource costs or taxation. Usually goods are imported by a general importer, then sold to the stores wholesale.

Another source of stock is overruns, surplus items and out-of-date food products. Real Deals, a regional dollar store in the Syracuse, New York area, is stocked almost entirely with surplus goods such as these. The legality of selling out-of-date goods varies between jurisdictions: in general, most items (with a few exceptions, particularly certain perishable food items depending on the state) can be sold in the United States regardless of their sell-by date, but in the United Kingdom it is illegal to sell goods after their "Use By" date.

Demography
Although some people may link variety stores with low-income areas, this is not always true. For example, Atherton, California has a variety store within its city limits, even though it has a median household income of nearly $185,000 a year. Studies of food discounters in Great Britain show quite a varied demographic, and 99p Stores reported an increase in higher-income customers after the financial crisis of 2007–2008.

By region

North America

According to IBISWorld, dollar stores have grown 43 percent since 1998 and have become a $56 billion industry. Colliers International claims there are more dollar stores than drug stores. With stores of other types closing in large numbers, dollar stores often replace other types of stores in shopping centers. They succeed partly because of impulse purchases. The common term in North America for a small general merchandise store is general store.

Five and dime stores

Frank Winfield Woolworth had seen the success in Michigan and western New York of so-called nickel stores, where everything cost five cents (the U.S. five cent coin is called a "nickel"). On February 22, 1879, Woolworth opened his Great Five Cent Store in Utica, New York, and it was his later success and expansion of that format as the F. W. Woolworth Company that would create the American institution of the five and ten cent store (or just five and ten), five and dime, or dime store (a dime is the name of a US ten-cent coin).  Before Woolworth, the prevailing thought was an entire store could not maintain itself with all low-priced goods, but with Woolworth's success, many others followed their lead.

Well-known dime store companies included:

 Ben Franklin Stores
 Butler Brothers
 Duckwall-ALCO
 G. C. Murphy
 H. L. Green
 J. G. McCrory's
 J. J. Newberry's
 John's Bargain Store
 McLellan Stores
 Morgan and Lindsey
 Neisner's
 S. H. Kress & Co.
 S. S. Kresge Co.
 Sprouse-Reitz
 TG&Y
 Walton's Five and Dime
 W. T. Grant
 Woolworth's

Of these, only Ben Franklin continues to exist in this form, while Kresge and Walton's became mega-retailers Kmart and Walmart, respectively.

Beginning around the 1960s, others tried the larger "discount store" format as well, such as TG&Y Family Centers, W. T. Grant, and Woolworth's Woolco stores.

With suburbanization in the 1950s and 1960s, Americans shopped more and more in malls rather than downtown shopping districts, and Newberry's and Woolworth's stores did open in the malls but even so, starting around the 1970s, variety stores lost business to other retail formats such as office stores, low-price shoe chains, fabric stores, toy stores and discount drug stores like Thrifty Drug Stores. Grocery stores and drug stores sold more and more candy. The last US Woolworth's closed in 1997. Newberry's was sold to McCrory (who maintained the brand) in 1972, McCrory itself went bankrupt in 1992 and all their brands disappeared in 2002.

Dollar stores

Starting in the late 1990s, dollar stores expanded enough to gain the attention of the national press. They were popular not only their value but because freestanding smaller stores were located in small towns, downtowns, and across the cities and suburbs, they were often more convenient than mall stores. They continued to grow and by 2019, for example, Dollar Tree had higher annual sales than Macy's. Dollar and variety store revenue reached $77 billion in 2018.

As of 2018, main dollar store chains in the U.S. were Dollar General, Dollar Tree (which owns Family Dollar), the 99 Cents Only Stores, and Five Below. Dollar stores are experiencing an increase of revenue, with around 14,000 Dollar Tree locations in the U.S. in 2018 with plans to open over a hundred more; 15,000 Dollar General locations with plans for 975 more in 2019; and Five Below with 745 stores.

Variety store chains in North America 
 In Canada: A Buck or Two (163+), Dollarama (1,095), Dollar Tree Canada (226), Everything For a Dollar Store, Great Canadian Dollar Store (100+), Your Dollar Store With More (180+)
 In Mexico: Prichos, Waldo's Dollar Mart, Miniso
 In the United States: 99 Cents Only Stores (386), Daiso (68), Dollar General (13,320),Dollar Tree (6,134), Family Dollar (7,974), Five Below (522)

Names for variety stores in North America 
 Dollar store, $1.25 store, 99-cent store, etc. in the United States and Canada plus other names. Dollar store is used predominantly, even when the maximum price is higher than one dollar. Some chains emphasize that the price is an even amount: $2, $5, etc., instead of having odd, "uneven" prices.
 Dólar y Algo Extra, La Reina, Almacenes Caravana in Puerto Rico
 dime store
 Five and Dime
 Five and Ten
 Nickel and Dime
 Nickel and Ten
 5 y 10 in Mexico (5 and 10 pesos, or 5 and ten U.S. cents in border cities) - incidentally, Cinco y Diez, meaning "Five and Ten" in Spanish, became an inner-suburban shopping district in Tijuana

Oceania 
 In Australia the main variety stores now consist of The Reject Shop, Daiso, Shiploads (in Tasmania), and a variety of smaller chains and independent shops. Former chains include Crazy Clark's, Homeart, Sam's Warehouse, Clint's Crazy Bargains, Go-Lo and Chickenfeed.
 In New Zealand: The $2 Shop, 1 2 3 Dollar Shop, and Coin Save

Names for variety stores in Oceania 
 The $2 shop in Australia and New Zealand
 Cheap Shop in Australia only

Asia 

In Japan, 100-yen shops (百円ショップ hyaku-en shoppu or 百均 hyakkin) have proliferated since around 2001. This is considered an after-effect of a decade-long recession of the Japanese economy. Despite the emphasis on value, however, some items, such as chocolate bars, may be priced higher than they are at other stores.

For a few years, 100-yen shops existed not as permanent stores, but as vendors under temporary, foldable tents. They were (and still are) typically found near the entrance areas of supermarkets.

A major player in 100-yen shops is the Daiso chain. The first store opened in 1991, and there are now around 2,400 stores in Japan. This number is increasing by around 40 stores per month. Daiso has also expanded into North America, Australia, Asia, and the Middle East.

In China, ¥2 (or ¥3, depending on the area's economic prosperity) shops have become a common sight in most cities. In Hong Kong, major department stores have opened their own $10 shops (US$1.28) to compete in the market, and there are now "$8 shops" (US$1.02) and even "$2 shops" (US$0.26) competing at lower prices, especially in poorer communities. Low prices are helped by Hong Kong's lack of a sales tax and its proximity to China.

In Taiwan, fixed price stores can be found in many locations, including night markets, regular shopping streets, regular market stalls, and department stores. Two typical price points are NT$39 and NT$49. Given that the retail environment in Taiwan is already highly competitive, it is not unusual to see such stores fail. Typically the goods for such stores are manufactured in China to keep costs down.

In India, US Dollar Store, founded in 2003, is a pioneer of single price stores. The merchandise for pilot stores was sent from America. As sales grew over the years with more than 200 operational stores in India, the merchandise is now imported from China, Indonesia, Thailand, Spain, Portugal, UK and various other countries as well as the US. US Dollar stores were founded by entrepreneur Gaurav Sahni, owner of Nanson Overseas Private Limited. Nanson, operated by Gaurav Sahni and his brother Gautam Sahni, has had an established sourcing and consolidation network for over two decades, with supply bases worldwide. Direct sourcing without intermediaries and stocking a large variety of merchandise as and when needed has given the company an advantage.

Variety store chains in Asia 
 In China: Miniso
 In India: US Dollar Store
 In Japan: Daiso, Daiei, Seria
 In Pakistan: Ghazali's HomeStore

Names for variety stores in Asia 
 100 fils Shop in Kuwait
 2 riyal Shop in Saudi Arabia and other Gulf countries
 100-yen shop or one coin shop in Japan
 10-dollar shop (US$1.28), 8-dollar shop, etc. in Hong Kong
 1000 Won shop in South Korea
 88 or 99 Peso store in Philippines
 49 & 99 shop in India
 Hakol Bedollar (everything for a Dollar) in Israel
 Ghazali's HomeStore in Pakistan
 Всё по 100 рублей (English: Everything at 100 rubles) in Russia
 10 or 20 Baht shop in Thailand
 2-ringgit stores in Malaysia

Europe 

 In Belgium, chains include Action, HEMA, and Zeeman.
 In Denmark: føtex, Tiger, a pun on the word for the Danish ten-krone coin, opened in the mid-nineties in Copenhagen and has since spread to other countries
 In France: Action, HEMA, Monoprix, Uniprix, M. 1-2-3. Zeeman
 In Germany, there are ToBi ("Totally Inexpensive") stores where most items cost one or two Euro or less. Other chains include Action, EuroShop, HEMA, Mäc-Geiz (240 stores), Pfennigland, Pfennigpfeiffer (110 stores), TEDi (1400 stores across Europe), Thomas Philipps (200 stores), and Zeeman
 In Greece: 300 (300 drachmas, €0.90) 
 In Hungary there are 100 forintos bolt ("100 forints store") stores, but they do not form a single chain, instead of being operated by small, independent companies.
 In Ireland: EuroGiant, Dealz
 In Italy: UPIM
 In Luxembourg: HEMA, Zeeman
 In Malta: Tal-Lira
 In the Netherlands: HEMA chain started in the Netherlands, sold goods using standard prices of 10, 25 or 50 cents, and later also 75 and 100 cents. After World War II, this model could not be sustained and the standard pricing system was abandoned. HEMA is the abbreviation of Hollandish standardized prices company. The HEMA had some 500 Dutch stores in 2011 and also operates in Belgium, Germany, Luxembourg and France. Since 2016 the chain is expanding in to other European countries such as Spain and the United Kingdom. Other chains include Action, Big Bazar, Euroland, and Zeeman.
 In Portugal there were Trezentos shops (300 escudos, €1.50), but with the introduction of the Euro currency, this designation is not used nowadays and the terms 'bazar' or 'euro store' are preferred. Chains include Eupoupo - Tudo a €0,99 ou €1,49
 In Russia: Fix Price (started from 30 roubles with growth up to 55 roubles, now cancelled this practice and moved to typical discount store).
 Spain there are Todo a 100 shops ("everything for 100 pesetas" (€0.60)), although due to the introduction of the euro and inflation, most products cost a multiple of €0.60 or €1. Most of these shops maintain their name in pesetas, and most of them have been renamed as Casi todo a 100 ("almost everything for 100 [pesetas]"), Todo a 100, 300, 500 y más ("everything for 100, 300, 500 or more") or Todo a un euro. Colloquially, the expression todo a 100 implies that something is either cheap, kitsch or low quality.
 In Sweden: Bubbeltian, called by some Tian, a colloquialism for ten kronor, US$1.20. Another chain that has been spreading in Sweden during the last seven years is Dollarstore, a chain where everything costs either 10, 20, 30, 40, 50 and steps of 50 up to 500 kr.
 In United Kingdom:  B & M, Boyes, HEMA, Home Bargains, Poundland, Poundstretcher, Poundwise

United Kingdom
Woolworth's opened its first store in the United Kingdom in 1909, when they were also colloquially known as "threepenny and sixpenny" stores, "3d and 6d" being displayed on the shops' frontages. More modern counterparts include Poundland OneBelow and the former 99p Stores.

Names for variety stores in Europe 
 100 forintos bolt in Hungary
 3,8 RON shop in Romania
 Всичко по 1 лев in Bulgaria
 Euro store, €2 store, etc. in the Eurozone
 Euroland (formerly known as knaakland) in the Netherlands
 Euroshop or 1-Euro-Shop in Germany
 Loja dos 300 in Portugal 300 escudos = 1.5 Eur
 Magasin à prix unique (English: one price store) in France
 Max20 (kroner) in Norway
 Pound shop, 99p shop, etc. in the United Kingdom
 Sve po 8/10/12 kuna in Croatia
 Sve za 79/99/100 dinara (Everything for 79/99/100 dinars) in Serbia
 Tal-Lira in Malta (Lira was Malta's old currency before transitioning to Euro)
 Todo a 100, 20 duros and SuperCien in Spain (former cien = 100 pesetas = €0.60)
 Wszystko za 5 złotych in Poland

South America 
In Argentina, variety stores are called todo por dos pesos (everything for 2 pesos).

Brazilians sometimes use the expression um e noventa e nove (R$ 1,99) to refer to cheap, low quality things or even people.

In Chile, they are called todo a mil (referring to the one thousand Chilean pesos banknote). They are commonly located in middle-class neighbourhoods where big retail stores don't usually venture and in small commercial districts like the ones in Santiago.

Variety stores in Colombia include Dollar City (Colombia version of Dollarama), D1, Ara, Miniso

In South America, variety stores may be known as:
 Dolarazo (US$1.00) and Cincuentazo (US$0.50) in Ecuador
 Loja de 1,99 (R$ 1,99 = US$1.07) in Brazil
 Todo por 23 pesos in Uruguay (23 pesos = US$1)
 Todo por dos Pesos in Argentina (1 peso = US$0.32)

Africa 
In Egypt, a variety store may be called a £E2.5 shop.

Global chains
Miniso is a Chinese variety store chain that specializes in household and consumer goods including cosmetics, stationery, toys, and kitchenware. In 2016, the company's sales revenue reached $1.5 billion. Miniso has expanded outside of the Chinese market and operates 1,800 stores in Asia, Europe, Oceania, Africa, North America, and South America.

See also

 Marketing
 Types of retail outlets
100-yen shop

References

External links
 

 
.
Retail formats